Events during the year 1971 in Northern Ireland.

Incumbents
 Governor - The Lord Grey of Naunton
 Prime Minister - James Chichester-Clark (until 23 March), Brian Faulkner (from 23 March)

Events
6 February – Gunner Robert Curtis becomes the first British Army soldier to be killed in The Troubles.
15 February – Decimal Day: The United Kingdom and Republic of Ireland both switch to decimal currency.
10 March – 1971 Scottish soldiers' killings: Three young off-duty Royal Highland Fusiliers are lured from a bar in Belfast and shot by the Provisional Irish Republican Army.
20 March – Maj. James Chichester-Clark resigns as Prime Minister of Northern Ireland. He is succeeded on 23 March by Brian Faulkner.
16 July – The Social Democratic and Labour Party (SDLP) announces that it is withdrawing from the Parliament of Northern Ireland.
9 August – Internment without trial is introduced in Northern Ireland. In Operation Demetrius, over 300 republicans are 'lifted' in pre-dawn raids. Some loyalists are later arrested. Twenty people die in riots that follow.
9–11 August – Ballymurphy massacre: Members of 1st Battalion, Parachute Regiment of the British Army kill 10 civilians in the Springfield Road area of west Belfast during Operation Demetrius; the victims are found by an inquest held in 2018–21 to be "entirely innocent".
12 August – British troops begin clearing operations in Belfast following the worst rioting in years. Taoiseach Jack Lynch calls for an end to the Stormont administration.
27 September – Prime ministers Edward Heath, Jack Lynch and Brian Faulkner meet at Chequers to discuss the Northern Ireland situation.
30 October – The Democratic Unionist Party is founded by the Rev. Ian Paisley.
19 November – Taoiseach Jack Lynch has talks with Prime Minister of the United Kingdom Harold Wilson in Dublin.
4 December – The McGurk's Bar bombing, carried out by the Ulster Volunteer Force in Belfast, kills fifteen people, the highest death toll from a single incident in the city during The Troubles.

Arts and literature
5 March – Ulster Hall, Belfast, becomes the first place in which Led Zeppelin play their iconic song "Stairway to Heaven".
Paul Muldoon publishes his first poetry collection Knowing My Place.
Frank Ormsby publishes his first poetry collection Ripe for Company.
Blackstaff Press established in Belfast.

Sport

Football
Irish League
Winners: Linfield

Irish Cup
Winners: Distillery 3 – 0 Derry City

Births
31 January – Patrick Kielty, comedian and television presenter.
1 February – Alan Fettis, footballer.
5 June – Susan Lynch, actress.
25 June – Neil Lennon, footballer.
13 July – Eamonn Magee, boxer.
2 August
 Michael Hughes, footballer.
 Anthony Tohill, Gaelic footballer.
10 September – David Humphreys, Ireland international rugby union footballer.
12 December – Naomi Long, née Johnston, Alliance Party leader and MLA.
Full date unknown – Darran Lindsay, motorcycle road racer (killed in practice 2006).

Deaths

24 January – St. John Greer Ervine, dramatist and author (born 1883).
15 May – Billy Reid, volunteer in Provisional Irish Republican Army, killed in gunfight with British Army (born 1939).
14 June – Gerard Dillon, artist (born 1916).
27 July – Charlie Tully, footballer (born 1924).

See also
1971 in Scotland
1971 in Wales

References

 
Northern Ireland